The Sindh Bank Limited is a Pakistani scheduled bank headquartered in Karachi.  It has over 330 branches in 169 cities.  It was set up as a state-owned bank, offering microfinance loans and other banking services.

Sindh Bank launched its new website of 1 June 2020.

History 
Sindh Bank Limited was established on 29 October 2010 with seed capital of Rs.10 billion, wholly subscribed by the Government of Sindh.

It commenced full-scale banking business in April 2011 and within just seven years, emerged as one of the fastest growing commercial banks in Pakistan, having established 330 on-line branches spread across 169 towns and cities of Pakistan. Out of these, 14 branches are dedicated to Islamic Banking.
Administratively, the branches are spread over the following three geographical regions:

North, comprising 124 branches in Punjab, Islamabad, KPK, AJK and Gilgit;
South, comprising 109 branches in Karachi and Baluchistan; and
Sindh Rural comprising 97 branches.

See also 
 List of Banks in Pakistan

References

External links 

 

Banks of Pakistan
Banks established in 2010
Government-owned banks of Pakistan
Companies based in Karachi
2010 establishments in Pakistan